General William Tecumseh Sherman (1820–1891) was a leading US Civil War general.

General Sherman may also refer to:

 General Sherman (tree), a giant sequoia tree
 USS General Sherman (1864), a U.S. Navy gunboat
 Francis Trowbridge Sherman (1825–1905), general on the Union side of the American Civil War
 Sidney Sherman (1805–1873), Texas Army general
 Thomas W. Sherman (1813–1879), general on the Union side of the American Civil War
 General Sherman, an American merchant-marine ship destroyed in Korean waters in the 1866 General Sherman incident

See also
Attorney General Sherman (disambiguation)